The Zhong-Sheng-Gong Memorial is a memorial in Pingtung City, Pingtung County, Taiwan.

History
The memorial was constructed in 1929 by the Zhen clan family members who moved to Taiwan from Guangdong during the Qing Dynasty in the 18th century. It was originally located on the banks of Wannian River. Over the years, more buildings were constructed surrounding the memorial.

Architecture
The memorial was built with traditional Hakka and Baroque architecture style. The memorial spans over an area of 3,010 m2 with two blocks and double bays. To honor their ancestors to show off their success, their relatives built the Zhong-Sheng-Gong Memorial in 1929.

Transportation
The memorial is accessible within walking distance east of Pingtung Station of Taiwan Railways.

See also
 Chinese ancestral veneration
 Chaolin Temple
 Donglong Temple
 Checheng Fuan Temple
 Three Mountains King Temple
 List of temples in Taiwan
 List of tourist attractions in Taiwan

References

1929 establishments in Taiwan
Ancestral shrines in Taiwan
Baroque architecture in Taiwan
Buildings and structures in Pingtung County